Guillaume Gouix (born 30 November 1983) is a French actor, director and screenwriter. He starred in the limited television series Gone for Good (2021).

Career
Guillaume Gouix learned acting at the Conservatory of Marseille, then at the Regional School of actors of Cannes.

On stage, he works often with directors of Didier Galas, Jean-Pierre Vincent and Bruno Bayen±.

Gouix made his big screen debut in the film "Deuxième quinzaine de juillet" directed by Christophe Reichert. He is also known for the role of Serge in the TV Series The Returned.

Personal life
Since 2014, Gouix has been in a relationship with French actress Alysson Paradis. In September 2015, the couple's first child, a son, was born. On 22 April 2022, Paradis announced that she's expecting her second child with Gouix.

Filmography

References

External links 

 

French male film actors
1983 births
Living people
People from Aix-en-Provence
21st-century French male actors
20th-century French male actors
French film directors
French male screenwriters
French screenwriters